Badhoevedorp is a town in the municipality of Haarlemmermeer in the province of North Holland, Netherlands. It lies next to the Ringvaart around Haarlemmermeer, the canal around the former Lake Haarlem, at the side of the polder bordering Amsterdam and Amstelveen.

Badhoevedorp has a population of around 11,370.

Notable residents include Björn Ottenheim of the band zZz, former Dutch national team footballer Marco van Basten, Jack van Gelder, Tonny Eyk and Toon van Driel. The Rijksweg 9 passes next to the town, from 8 August 1967 to 10 April 2017, the motorway passed through the town, however it was diverted, with the original section being closed and demolished to make place for new development in the area.

Notable people from Badhoevedorp
 Jan Buis (1933), Dutch road cyclist
 Rick van der Linden (1946), Dutch composer and keyboardist, member of Ekseption, Trace, as well as solo
 George Boeree (1952), psychologist and creator of Lingua Franca Nova
 Sven Botman (2000), footballer for Premier League Club Newcastle United

Economy
MGA Entertainment's Benelux division has its headquarters in Badhoevedorp. Sony Corporation's Benelux and European divisions also had their headquarters in Badhoevedorp until its European division was split between two new headquarters in Berlin (Sony Center Potsdamer Platz) and London in the early-2000s, while its Benelux division moved its headquarters to Hoofddorp in 2016. The former Sony Badhoevedorp building was converted into a hotel in 2019.

Sports
The town has an amateur sports club called SC Badhoevedorp that houses futsal, baseball and softball division's.

References

Populated places in North Holland
Haarlemmermeer